Carrusel is a Mexican children's telenovela produced by Valentín Pimstein for Televisa in 1989. It's based on the Argentinean character Jacinta Pichimahuida (first televised in 1966), and produced by and broadcast on Televisa in 1989. It covers daily life in a Mexican elementary school and the children's relationships with a charismatic teacher named Ximena. Among other plot devices, it deals with the differences between the upper and lower classes of Mexican society – specifically as seen in a romantic relationship between Cirilo, a poor black boy, and a spoiled white rich girl, Maria Joaquina Villaseñor.

Gabriela Rivero starred as main protagonist, while Janet Ruiz and Beatriz Moreno starred as main antagonists. Ludwika Paleta, Pedro Javier Viveros, Hilda Chávez, Flor Eduarda Gurrola, Joseph Birch, Abraham Pons, Mauricio Armando, Gabriel Castañon, Yoshiki Takiguchi, Manuel Fernández, Karin Nisembaum, and Silvia Guzmán starred as stellar performances.

Plot
The story begins with the daily lives of a group of schoolchildren from a Mexican primary school ("Escuela Mundial") and the relations of the latter with their teacher, Ximena. In the series, several issues about life, while stressing values such as love, trust and friendship touched.

The character of school
 Teacher Ximena Fernández is like the embodiment of all that is good. She is a teacher, friend and mother to her students. She shows friendliness and enormous patience, she is loved by all.
 Cirilo Rivera is a good boy, and the only child of black ancestry in school. He is the son of a humble carpenter and a housewife who worship him to the utmost.
 María Joaquina Villaseñor is a rich girl, daughter of a renowned and prestigious physician (Dr. Miguel Villaseñor). Beautiful, selfish, overlooked by her colleagues, but eventually learns to value the important things in life.
 Laura Quiñones is a fat spread and romantic girl. She spends most of the day with a big sandwich in hand, and never missed an opportunity to let go a sigh and say, That's so romantic, or else, you are very anti-Romantic.
 Kokimoto Mishima is a boy of Japanese origin and the only Asian child at school. Always with his karate belt tied around his head, he was one of the henchmen and bodyguard of Pablo Guerra in the early chapters and later was replaced on paper as right arm by Mario Pablo Ayala. His sentence was characteristic: "Yyyaaaaa yyyyaaaaaa!!!" (a battle cry used in karate).
 Bibi Smith is a girl of American origin, "the gringo group" is a polite and gentle, very friendly girl. She speaks Spanish imperfectly, since she also speaks English.
 David Rovinovich is a Jewish boy, angelic face and curly blond hair. Little David wastes no time with the girls, coming to fall in love with Valeria, one of his classmates.
 Valeria Ferrer is the girlfriend of David Robinovich. She is a cheerful girl and joker character who helps others but cannot help her joking, she is not as bad as Pablo Guerra.
 Jaime Palillo is a robust, stocky, rough and clumsy child, but also very brave to come forward and defend his friends, especially Cirilo. His biggest complication is the school subjects. It's low profile in studies but after all he does get some recognition.
 Pablo Guerra is the naughty boy of the class, but often his jokes go too far, used to annoy his sister Marcelina and make jokes.
 Marcelina Guerra is the sister of Pablo. Pablo would often make fun of her, annoy her and show the quality of dislike towards her but Marcelina still likes his brother no matter what.
 Pedro Simishikis is the cousin of Maria Joaquina that only occurs on the birthday of Maria Joaquina.
 Daniel Zapata is one of the top students in the class and the leader of the Patrulla Salvadora. He is regarded by all as a good friend and a good leader.
 Carmen Carrillo a noble, kind, and loving girl who has to endure the difficult situation faced by her parents. However, she tries very well to succeed at school and she is very excellent in her notes at school.
 Jorge del Salto is a rich boy, smug and pampered by his mother, who thinks he is superior to all children by their economic status, having empathy alone with Maria Joaquina, who is the only one whom he believes is in his class.
 Mario Ayala is a boy living with his father and stepmother, the latter is an abusive woman who loves tormenting Mario because she does not consider him his son. The first coming to school, he responds badly to teacher Ximena which leaves him in the classroom crying, this causes him to be severely punished by his peers, later becomes the right arm of Pablo Guerra.
 Alicia Guzmán is another of the girls attending the second year of teacher Ximena, being very fond of all the girls in the classroom, sharing many adventures with them once, suffering from an attack of appendicitis she had to be urgently operated on by the father of Maria Joaquina.
 Margarita Garza is a native girl from Monterrey that came to live in Mexico City with her mother. A distinctive characteristic, wearing a different uniform from the school children in Mexico City (She wore the uniform of the headquarters of the Escuela Mundial of Monterrey) with jacket and cowboy boots.
 Clementina Suárez was a child who initially was in the second year of teacher Ximena, but had to drop out of school because her parents suffered a traffic accident and were hospitalized in Guadalajara.

Cast

The children
 Ludwika Paleta as María Joaquina Villaseñor
 Pedro Javier Vivero as Cirilo Rivera
 Johan Sierra as Pedro Simishikis 
 Joseph Birch as David Ravinovich
 Gabriel Castañón as Mario Ayala
 Hilda Chávez as Laura Quiñones
 Manuel Fernández as Adrián García
 Gina Garcia as Marcelina Guerra
 Flor Edwarda Gurrola as Carmen Carrillo
 Silvia Guzmán as Alicia Guzmán
 Jorge Granillo as Jaime Palillo
 Kristel Klitbo as Valeria Ferrer
 Ramón Valdez Urtiz as Abelardo Cruz
 Mauricio Armando as Pablo Guerra
 Karin Nisembaum as Bibi Smith
 Abraham Pons as Daniel Zapata
 Yoshiki Takiguchi as Kokimoto Mishima
 Rafael Omar as Jorge del Salto
 Erika Garza as Clementina Suárez

The adults
 Gabriela Rivero as Teacher Ximena Fernández
 Augusto Benedico as Don Fermín #1
 Armando Calvo as Don Fermín #2
 Odiseo Bichir as Federico Carrillo
 Rebeca Manríquez as Inés de Carrillo
 Johnny Laboriel as José Rivera
 Verónica con K. as Belen de Rivera
 Arturo García Tenorio as Ramón Palillo
 Adriana Laffan as Luisa de Palillo
 Álvaro Cerviño as Dr. Miguel Villaseñor
 Karen Sentíes as Clara de Villaseñor #1
 Kenia Gascón as Clara de Villaseñor #2
 David Ostrosky as Isaac Ravinovich
 Gerardo Paz as Samuel Muñoz
 Rossana Cesarman as Rebeca de Ravinovich
 Beatriz Moreno as Directora Felicia Orraca
 Raquel Pankowsky as Teacher Matilde Mateuche
 Alejandro Tommasi as Alberto del Salto
 Cecilia Gabriela as Roxana de del Salto
 Marcial Salinas as Germán Ayala
 Beatriz Ornella as Natalia de Ayala
 Oscar Narváez as Ricardo Ferrer
 Bárbara Córcega as Elena de Ferrer
 Ismael Larumbe as Roberto Guerra
 Erika Magnus as Isabel de Guerra
 Manuel Guízar as Sr. Marcos Morales
 Yula Pozo as Juanita
 Janet Ruiz as Teacher Susana
 Pituka de Foronda as Sara Ravinovich
 Blanca Torres as Toña
 Ada Carrasco as Aunt Matilde
 Queta Carrasco as Aunt Rosa
 Ignacio Retes as Sr. Ortiz
 Tony Carbajal as Elías
 Lupita Sandoval as Dorotea

Awards

References

External links
 

1989 telenovelas
Mexican telenovelas
Televisa telenovelas
1989 Mexican television series debuts
1990 Mexican television series endings
Television series about children
Television shows set in Mexico City
Children's telenovelas
Mexican television series based on Argentine television series